The Remix Album is an album by the English-Canadian girl group All Saints. It was released in 1998, following the success of their eponymous debut album and features remixes of the songs from it, most of which had not been released before.  The tracks were mixed together, by DJ Pete Tong, so that they are played continuously without any gaps.

Track listing

In early pressings of the album, Timbaland's name was misprinted as Timberland.

Charts

References

External links
 Official site

1998 remix albums
All Saints (group) albums
London Records remix albums